Tunnabora Peak is a  mountain summit located on the crest of the Sierra Nevada mountain range in California. It is situated on the common border of Tulare County with Inyo County, as well as the shared boundary of Sequoia National Park and John Muir Wilderness. Tunnabora ranks as the 51st-highest peak in California.

History

The first ascent of the summit was made in August 1905 by George R. Davis, USGS topographic engineer.
The peak's name was submitted by the National Park Service, and officially adopted by the United States Board on Geographic Names in 1928. The etymology is uncertain, possibly Shoshonean, Mono dialect.

Climate
Tunnabora Peak has an alpine climate. Most weather fronts originate in the Pacific Ocean, and travel east toward the Sierra Nevada mountains. As fronts approach, they are forced upward by the peaks, causing them to drop their moisture in the form of rain or snowfall onto the range (orographic lift). Precipitation runoff from this mountain drains west to the Kern River via Wallace Creek, and east to Owens Valley via George and Hogback Creeks.

Gallery

See also

 List of the major 4000-meter summits of California
 Mount Carl Heller

References

External links
 Weather forecast: Tunnabora Peak
 Tunnabora Peak photo: PBase

Mountains of Tulare County, California
Mountains of Sequoia National Park
Inyo National Forest
Mountains of Inyo County, California
Mountains of the John Muir Wilderness
North American 4000 m summits
Mountains of Northern California
Sierra Nevada (United States)